Jocelyn Davies (born 18 June 1959, Usk, Monmouthshire, Wales) is a  Plaid Cymru politician who was a member of the Welsh Assembly (AM), for the  South Wales East region from 1999 until 2016. She was Deputy Minister for Housing and Regeneration in the Labour/Plaid coalition government from 2007 until 2011.

Background
After attending Newbridge Grammar School, she read law at Harris Manchester College, Oxford. One of the first lay-inspectors of schools in 1993. Davies is married to Newbridge councillor Mike Davies. In 2004, she discovered tissue samples from their daughter, stillborn 16 years previously, were still being held in a Newport hospital.

Davies has three children.

Political career
Davies was a councillor on Islwyn Borough Council between 1987 and 1991, and contested the 1995 Islwyn by-election.

She has been a member of the National Assembly for Wales, list member for South Wales East, since 1999 and has served as Plaid Cymru Party Business Manager from 2000 to 2007.

In the Second Assembly, she was Chair on both the Committee on the Inquiry into the E.coli outbreak in Wales and the South Wales East Regional Committee.

In the Third Assembly, she was appointed Deputy Minister for Housing in the Labour and Plaid Cymru coalition government on 19 July.

She retired from the Assembly at the 2016 election.

Post Assembly
Davies currently sits on the Audit Risk and Assurance Committee for the Future Generations Commissioner for Wales.

References

Offices held

1959 births
Living people
Plaid Cymru members of the Senedd
Wales AMs 1999–2003
Wales AMs 2003–2007
Wales AMs 2007–2011
Wales AMs 2011–2016
People from Usk
Plaid Cymru councillors
Plaid Cymru parliamentary candidates
Councillors in Wales
Female members of the Senedd
Alumni of Harris Manchester College, Oxford
Members of the Welsh Assembly Government
20th-century British women politicians
Women members of the Welsh Assembly Government
Women councillors in Wales